Henry Maynard Mills (18 August 1847 – 13 April 1915) was an English first-class cricketer active 1879–81 who played for Middlesex and Marylebone Cricket Club (MCC). He was born in Paddington; died in Buenos Aires.

References

1847 births
1915 deaths
English cricketers
Middlesex cricketers
Marylebone Cricket Club cricketers
Gentlemen of England cricketers